The Korg Polysix (PS-6) is a six-voice programmable polyphonic analog synthesizer released by Korg in 1981.

Features 

The synthesizer's main features are six-voice polyphony (with unison and chord memory voice assignment modes), 32 memory slots for patches and cassette port for backing up patches, and an arpeggiator. 

At the time of its release, the Polysix, along with the contemporary Roland Juno-6, was one of the first affordably priced polyphonic analog synthesizers. It cost about twice as much as the competing Juno-6 but had more features. It also had on-board patch storage and backup which the cheaper Juno lacked until the upgraded Juno-60 model.

Korg developed the Polysix with an eye on the Sequential Circuits Prophet 5, trying to provide some of the features found on the more expensive synth in a compact, reliable and much cheaper design. While not as powerful, it used SSM2044 4-pole voltage-controlled filters, giving the Polysix a warm, rounded, and organic sound.

Although the Polysix only had one oscillator per voice, it also featured built in chorus, phaser, and 'ensemble' effects (using a 'bucket brigade' analog delay line design), to provide a fuller sound.

Oscillators 

A typical concern for synthesizers equipped with voltage controlled oscillators (VCO), rather than digitally controlled oscillators, is with tuning, as the analog VCO circuits are temperature sensitive and will drift in pitch as the instrument warms up. Almost all VCO based synthesizers of this era provided an automatic or manually activated auto-tuning function, to start an alignment routine and keep all oscillators in tune with each other. To achieve this, the pitch control circuitry for each voice would be adjusted by the auto-tune routine individually. 

The Polysix however does not include an auto-tune feature. Instead, Korg used an alternative method: a single control circuit is demuxed to control all six voices which have been calibrated manually to track in tune together. This allowed them to avoid a complex tuning function that would increase the cost of parts and programming.

Audio path 

The Polysix had a straightforward synthesis architecture. Each voice had one oscillator with sawtooth wave, variable pulse wave, or PWM outputs. The PWM section had its own LFO. In addition, there is a sub-oscillator that allows the addition of a square wave either one or two octaves below the main VCO pitch.

The filter has controls for cutoff frequency, resonance, envelope amount and keyboard tracking. The envelope control has a center zero, letting the user select either a normal or an inverted envelope. The envelope is an ADSR type.
 
The VCA can be operated from either the envelope or a gate signal.

The mixed sound of all the voices can be sent to an effects section, which offers three modulated delay-based effects (Chorus, Phase or Ensemble setting). This acts to fatten the sound considerably, and was a key feature at the time of release.

Modulation 

The LFO (known here as a 'modulation generator') is a simple triangle wave that can be routed to the VCO, VCF or VCA. It has a variable delay before it is triggered.

Reliability 

Although built into a substantial (and heavy) chipboard case, the Polysix has some reliability problems.

Like other programmable synthesizers of the era, it had a rechargeable nickel-cadmium battery that powered the memory when the unit was switched off. The original batteries are now well past their designed lifespan and thus prone to failure, leaving the instrument unable to recall user designed patches from its memory. More seriously, if the battery is not replaced, it can leak and corrode the circuits. Unfortunately for the Polysix, this battery is mounted on the main processor board and corrosion here can be fatally damaging to the circuitry of the instrument.

Some instruments of its era had begun the move towards digital technology by using DCOs or microprocessor-generated envelopes.  The Polysix, however, used a separate analog VCO, VCF and envelope generator for each voice. Whilst this might have benefits for the richness of the sound, the extra complexity also brings greater tuning problems and more possibilities for failure.

The Polysix keyboard used a light plastic keyboard with conductive rubber contacts. These contacts are often the source of 'dead' keys on the keyboard. This is probably the most common problem on old Polysix units, and one shared with some other Korg instruments that used the same keyboard, such as the Poly-61 and Mono/Poly.

The patch recall buttons also have a tendency to fail.

Software
There is a software emulator of the Polysix included in the Korg Legacy Collection called Polysix Legacy Edition. This software is a full digital replica (emulation) of the hardware Polysix. And was also part of the LAC-1 expansion for the Korg OASYS and is one of the Korg Kronos sound engines.  More recently, KORG introduced a mobile iOS application for iPad ( iPolysix ), which faithfully reproduces the dynamics of the original.

In July 2013, KORG introduced a PolySix instrument for Propellerhead Reason 7.

Notable users
 14 Bis
 Alphaville
 Astral Projection
Blancmange
 China Crisis
Chvrches
 Clarence Jey
 Clio ("Faces", "Eyes")
 Damon Albarn (Blur / Gorillaz)
 Eat Static
 EOTO
 Europe
 Eric Prydz
 Geoff Downes
 Jean-Michel Jarre
 Jens Johansson
 Jimi Tenor
 Keith Emerson
 Kerri Chandler (used in "Bar A Thym" with the Brave Arp preset)
 Kitaro
 P-Model
 Uchoten
 Polysics (also named after the instrument)
 Robert Rich
 Roger Powell
 Ruja
 Tears for Fears
 The Kinks
 The Sound
 Zoot Woman (two Polysixes can be seen in the "Living in a Magazine" video)
 Margita Stefanović (Ekatarina Velika)

References

 Vintage Synth Explorer
 Synth Museum

External links
Polysix mailing list digest page
Analog.no: original factory patches
Polysix owner's manual in PDF
New patches from AnalogAudio1

P
Analog synthesizers
Polyphonic synthesizers
Musical instruments invented in the 1980s